Christopher Reginald Travis (born December 2, 1993) is an American rapper and record producer from Orange Mound, Memphis, Tennessee. He began his career in 2012 as a solo artist on YouTube and later on became a member of SpaceGhostPurrp's Raider Klan collective, which he left in 2013. Since then, he has formed his own independent label, Water Boyz Entertainment. He is a former member of Seshollowaterboyz, a collective with fellow American rappers Bones, Xavier Wulf and Eddy Baker.

Discography

Compilation albums 
 Soundcloud V Files, Vol.1 (2018)

Extended plays 
 Stay Pure (2013)
 After Effects (2014)
 Sea Beds (with Bones) (2014)
 Water Talk (with P2 the Gold Mask) (2014)
 No Trespassing (with Robb Banks) (2015)
8LVLS (2020)

Mixtapes 
 Hell on Earth (2012)
 Pizza & Codeine (2012)
 275 Greatest Hits Vol. 1 (with Raider Klan) (2012)
 Side Effects (2013)
 BRK Greatest Hits Vol. 2 (with Raider Klan) (2013)
 Hidden in the Mist (2013)
 Born in the Winter (2013)
 Gotham City (2014)
 Never Forget (2014)
 Silence of Me Eternally (2014)
 Go Home (2014)
 Live from the East (2015)
 See You There (2015)
 Art of Destruction (2015)
 The Ruined (2016)
 Shark Boy (2016)
 Forgive Me (2017)
 WATERSZN (2017)
 Water World (2018)
 Teenage Freak Show (2019)
 Tape of Terror (2019)
 WATERSZN 2 (2020)
 Venom   (2021)
  901 Fm    (2022)

Compilation Mixtapes 
 Unreleased '13 (2013)

Guest appearances

References

People from Memphis, Tennessee
Living people
1993 births
MNRK Music Group artists